Marianne Berglund (born 23 June 1963) is a Swedish former road racing cyclist. On 3 September 1983 she won the women's road race during the UCI Road World Championships in Altenrhein, Switzerland. She also won the Tour of Texas. She rode in the 1984 Summer Olympics and the 1988 Summer Olympics. In 1990, she won the first edition of Tjejtrampet.

References

External links
 Radsportseiten 

1963 births
Living people
Swedish female cyclists
Cyclists at the 1984 Summer Olympics
Cyclists at the 1988 Summer Olympics
Olympic cyclists of Sweden
People from Skellefteå Municipality
Sportspeople from Västerbotten County